uSens, Inc. is a Silicon Valley startup founded in 2014 in San Jose, California. The company's core team includes researchers and developers building interactive and immersive computer-vision tracking solutions. The team has extensive experience in artificial intelligence (AI), computer vision, 3D Human–computer interaction (HCI) technology and augmented reality and virtual reality. uSens has been applying computer vision and AI technologies in AR/VR, Automotive and smartphones.  

uSens has its corporate headquarters in San Jose, California, with additional offices in China in Beijing, Hangzhou, and Shenzhen.

History
The co-founder of uSens, Dr. Yue Fei, is a researcher in the field of 3D user interfaces and virtual reality who earned his PhD from Rice University in Space Physics.

uSens has developed products in the area of HCI, such as the Fingo Virtual Touch, selling in China. Fingo Virtual Touch uses the company's patented Fingo technology. Fingo is the hardware and software that uSens has developed to allow a user to interact with a digital interface, like a smart TV without the need to touch any surface; it can sense finger movements and hand gestures. It consists of a small sensor and a set of software algorithms that automatically “sense” and translate hand gestures into movements onscreen.

In March 2015, the company launched a Kickstarter campaign to fund a VR/AR hardware product, reaching its initial funding goal within a few days. In February 2017, uSens announced that it would refund all Kickstarter backers.

uSens announced a $20 million Series A funding round in June 2016 led by Fosun Kinzon Capital. Additional participants included returning investor Maison Capital, joined by new investors Great Capital, Fortune Capital, Oriental Fortune Capital, iResearch Capital, Chord Capital, and ARM Innovation Ecosystem Accelerator. The company previously received a pre-Series A investment of $5.5 million from co-led by IDG Ventures, Lebox Capital and Maison Capital.

See also
 Augmented reality
 Gesture recognition
 Mixed reality
 Motion capture
 Virtual reality

References

External links
 

Mixed reality
Virtual reality companies
Augmented reality
Gesture recognition
Technology companies based in the San Francisco Bay Area